Tuckahoe is an unincorporated community in Jasper County, in the U.S. state of Missouri.

History
Tuckahoe had its start in the 1870s as a mining community. A post office called Tuckahoe was established in 1891, and remained in operation until 1906.

References

Unincorporated communities in Jasper County, Missouri
Unincorporated communities in Missouri